This is a list of mills known to have existed within Rochdale Borough, in Greater Manchester, England.

A-B

C to D

E to G

H to L

M to N

O to P

R to S

T

U to V

W to Z

See also

List of mills in Shaw and Crompton

References

External links

 Mills in Heywood (1922)

Rochdale
Buildings and structures in the Metropolitan Borough of Rochdale
Rochdale
Rochdale
Rochdale
History of the textile industry
Industrial Revolution in England